Amarasiri is a Sinhalese name that may refer to the following notable people:
Given name
Amarasiri Dodangoda (1941–2009), Sri Lankan politician
Amarasiri Kalansuriya (born 1940), Sri Lankan film actor
Amarasiri Peiris (born 1946), Sri Lankan singer

Surname
Aloka Amarasiri (born 1989), Sri Lankan cricketer
Sirisena Amarasiri (1925–2007), Sri Lankan politician

Sinhalese surnames
Sinhalese masculine given names